Sounds of Synanon is the debut album by jazz guitarist Joe Pass. The album was recorded with patients at the Synanon Drug Center where Pass was being treated for addiction to heroin.

Reception
Jazz critic Leonard Feather reviewed the album for the July 5, 1962 issue of DownBeat magazine and said, "This album does more than merely present a group of good musicians, it unveils a star. In Joe Pass, Synanon and Pacific Jazz have discovered a major jazz talent..."

Track listing

Personnel
 Joe Pass – electric guitar
 Dave Allen – trumpet
 Greg Dykes – baritone horn
 Arnold Ross – piano
 Ronald Clark – bass
 Bill Crawford – drums

References

1961 debut albums
Joe Pass albums
Pacific Jazz Records albums